Edward "Denver Ed" Martin (September 10, 1881, or 1877 – May 11, 1937) was an American boxer who was the World Colored Heavyweight Champion from February 24, 1902, when he beat Frank Childs, until February 5, 1903, when he lost his title to Jack Johnson, the only Colored Heavyweight Champion (and first African American) to win the world's heavyweight championship.

Known as "Denver Ed Martin" and "The Colorado Giant", Martin was born in Denver, Colorado, on September 10, 1881 (or 1877). His father was born in Alabama and his mother in Georgia. Martin was a strong boxer with renowned footwork who was a strong puncher.

World Colored Heavyweight Champ
Martin made his debut against former colored heavyweight champ Bob Armstrong on June 6, 1899, at the Lenox Athletic Club in New York City and was knocked out in the second round. He became the colored heavyweight champ when he beat title-holder Frank Childs in a bout in Chicago on February 25, 1902, out-pointing the champ in a six-round contest.

He defended the colored heavyweight title against rival Bob Armstrong at the Crystal Palace in  London on July 25, 1902. According to the Associated Press coverage of the fight:
"Martin proved the cleverer and never gave his opponent a chance, being declared an easy winner on points at the close of the fifteenth round; Martin, it is announced, will challenge the winner of the Jeffries-Fitzsimmons fight in San Francsico."

World heavyweight champ James J. Jeffries, who had fought Armstrong and other African American boxers on the way up through the ranks, maintained the color bar erected by bare-knuckles champ John L. Sullivan, though Martin was not given a title shot. Instead, he met Armstrong for a rematch in Philadelphia on December 10. According to the Daily Gazette and Bulletin:
 "The bout was fast from the start and both men narrowly escaped a knockout. The bell saved Armstrong in the third and fifth and Martin was floored six times in the fourth round."

The six-round bout ended in a no decision. In his next fight, Martin lost his title to Jack Johnson in a decision after 20 rounds. The two fighters treated each other cautiously in the first 10 rounds, but Johnson dropped Martin in the 11th with a right hand to the neck. It was the first of five times he hit the canvas in that round. With his footwork, Martin managed to go the distance, but lost the title.

Martin met Johnson in a rematch for the colored heavyweight title match in Los Angeles on October 18, 1904, and was knocked out in the second round. In addition to the colored heavyweight title, he shared the distinction with Johnson of having beaten future Oscar winner Victor McLaglen in the ring, before the pugilist turned to acting. Johnson beat McLaglen in a six-round exhibition in 1909, while Martin knocked out McLaglen in the third round of a scheduled 20-round bout in Aberdeen, Washington the year before.

Johnson broke the color bar in 1908 when he beat Canadian Tommy Burns and became the first African American heavyweight champion of the world. As the heavyweight champ, Johnson dodged African American heavyweights too, though it was on the basis that a fight between two black boxers would prove a bust at the box office. Just like Jeffries, he did not give Martin a shot at the world heavyweight title, either.

Retirement and comeback
Martin retired in 1914, after a loss to Englishman Tom Cowler, "The Cumberland Giant", who knocked him out in the second round. He moved to the Portland, Oregon area, where he kept his hand in the fight game and refereed fights. He staged a comeback in Oregon in 1921, winning three fights, all by knock-outs. None of the fights went more than four rounds.

Martin's last fight was similar to his first in that it involved a fellow colored heavyweight champ. On November 18, 1921, he met colored heavyweight champ Harry Wills in a ten-round bout in  Milwaukie, Oregon. Wills knocked Martin down six times before knocking him out in the first round. He retired with a record of 23 wins (17 by KO), nine losses (eight by KO) and three + draws. He also won two newspaper decisions.

In 1933, Martin was living in Oakland, California where he ran a cigar shop. He died on May 11, 1937, in Oakland and was buried at Mountain View Cemetery in that same city.

Professional boxing record
All information in this section is derived from BoxRec, unless otherwise stated.

Official record

All newspaper decisions are officially regarded as “no decision” bouts and are not counted in the win/loss/draw column.

Unofficial record

Record with the inclusion of newspaper decisions in the win/loss/draw column.

References

Boxers from Colorado
Heavyweight boxers
African-American boxers
World colored heavyweight boxing champions
19th-century births
1937 deaths
Year of birth uncertain
American male boxers